
Li family or Lee family may refer to:

Lee family, family of American politicians

Modern Asia
Lee family (Singapore), family of Singaporean politicians
Li Shek-pang family, Hong Kong banking family 
Li Ka-shing family, Hong Kong business family
Eight Li brothers from 20th-century China
Cantonese family that runs the company Lee Kum Kee

Martial arts
Li (Lee) Family, a style of Chinese martial arts
Lee-style t'ai chi ch'uan, a style of taijiquan (t'ai chi ch'uan)

Chinese history
Ruling family of Cheng Han (304–347)
House of Li, ruling family of the Western Liang (400–421) and Tang (618–690, 705–907) dynasties
Ruling family of Jin (Later Tang precursor) (896–923) and Later Tang (923–937)
Ruling family of Southern Tang (937–976)
Ruling family of Dingnan Jiedushi from 881 to 1038 and Western Xia (1038–1227)

Vietnamese history
Lý (李) can also be romanized as Lí
Two of the three rulers of Former Lý (544–602)
Ruling family of the Lý dynasty (1009–1225)

Korean history
Yi (李, 이) can also be romanized as Li (리)
House of Yi, ruling family of Joseon and Korean Empire from 1392 to 1910

See also
Li (surname)
Li (surname 李)
Li (disambiguation)
Li Family Historical Residence, Gushan District, Kaohsiung, Taiwan
Lee's Family Reunion, 2010–2011 Taiwanese TV series
House of Lê (Lê is the Sino-Vietnamese reading of 黎 Lí)